The following highways are numbered 355:

Canada
Manitoba Provincial Road 355
 New Brunswick Route 355
Prince Edward Island Route 355
Saskatchewan Highway 355

Japan
 Japan National Route 355

United States
  Interstate 355
  Arkansas Highway 355
  District of Columbia Route 355
  Georgia State Route 355
  Georgia State Route 355 Loop (former)
  Kentucky Route 355
  Louisiana Highway 355
  Maryland Route 355
Mississippi Highway 355
  New York State Route 355
 New York State Route 355 (former)
  Ohio State Route 355 (former)
  Puerto Rico Highway 355
  Tennessee State Route 355
 Texas:
  Texas State Highway 355 (former)
  Texas State Highway Loop 355 (former)
  Texas Farm to Market Road 355
  Virginia State Route 355
 Virginia State Route 355 (former)